Balaraju is a 1948 Indian Telugu-language swashbuckler fantasy film produced and directed by Ghantasala Balaramayya under the Pratibha Productions banner. It stars Akkineni Nageswara Rao, S. Varalakshmi, and Anjali Devi with music jointly composed by Ghantasala, Galipenchala Narasimha Rao and C. R. Subbaraman. The film was recorded as an Industry Hit at the box office and was the first Telugu Silver Jubilee film.

Plot
The story begins in heaven; a Devakanya Mohini and a Yaksha are in love. Indra, the ruler of Suvarloka, has an interest in Mohini. His emissary Kubera, unable to separate the lovers, curses Yaksha to be born as a human. Mohini refuses to bow to the wish of Indra, who then curses her to be born as a human and pine for her lover. The Yaksha, now Balaraju, is brought up by a shepherd. Mohini is found in a field by Kamma Naidu, who names her Sita and brings her up. As she grows up, pressure mounts on him to perform her marriage. Fearing that the wealth he had acquired after her arrival may disappear if she leaves him, he refuses to get her married and keeps her in a solitary tower in a forest.

Balaraju and his companion Yelamanda pass by that route. Attracted by the music that Balaraju plays on his flute, Sita escapes to meet him. She recognizes him, but his memory fails him due to the curse. She makes attempts to revive their love. The story takes interesting twists when the hero is turned into a snake by an angry sage. Balaraju regains his memory and realizes that he is in love with Sita. Indra once again makes an attempt to separate the lovers. Unable to bear any further agony, Sita is all set to curse Indra when the Gods appear and Indra seeks Sita's pardon. He invites the couple to Suvarloka, but Balaraju and Mohini prefer a blissful life on the earth.

Cast

Akkineni Nageswara Rao as Balaraju	
S. Varalakshmi as Seeta		
Anjali Devi as Mohini					
Kasturi Siva Rao as Yalamanda
Seetaram as Rayudu
D. S. Sadasiva Rao as Indra
G. Ramayya as Kammanaidu
G. Subba Rao as Shetty
A. L. Narayana as Gandharva
N. Krishnayya as Agni
G. Narayana Rao as Kubera
C. Venkateswara Rao as Yaksha
A. Aadi Seshaiah as Lord Shiva
K. Ram Murthy as Varuna
T. K. V. Naidu as Rushi
Lingam Subba Rao as Thief
K. K. Ayangar as Chalamayya
K. V. Subba Rao as Peda Naidu
Surabhi Balasaraswathi
Naarimani as Lakshmi
C. Rajaratnam as Lakshmamma
B. Seetabayamma as Punnamma
Anasuya
Krishnaveni

Crew
Art: S. V. S. Rama Rao
Choreography: Vedantam Raghavayya
Screenplay - Lyrics - Dialogues: Samudrala Sr.
Playback: Ghantasala, S. Varalakshmi, V. Sarala Rao, Kasturi Siva Ram
Music: Galipenchala Narasimha Rao, Ghantasala Venkateswara Rao
Background Score: C. R. Subburaman
Story: Prayaaga (also Folklore Songs)
Editing: T. M. Lal
Cinematography: P. Sridhar
Producer - Director: Ghantasala Balaramayya
Banner: Pratibha Films
Release Date: 26 February 1948

Soundtrack

Music composed by Galipenchala Narasimha Rao, Ghantasala Venkateswara Rao. Lyrics were written by Samudrala Sr.

Box office
 The film ran for more than 100 days in 11 centres in Andhra Pradesh.
 The Silver Jubilee celebrations were held at Jaihind Talkies, Vijayawada on 4 June 1948.
This film had a 365-day run in Vijayawada.

References

External links
 Balaraju film at IMDb.
 Balaraju film at Ghantasala.info
 BalaRaju Movie at Basthi.com

1940s Telugu-language films
1948 films
Indian black-and-white films
Indian fantasy films
1940s fantasy films
Films scored by Gali Penchala Narasimha Rao